Dale Soules (born ) is an American actress known for starring in The Messenger and portraying Frieda Berlin in Orange Is the New Black from 2014 to 2019.

Early life 
She attended West Milford High School. While in high school, Soules became interested in acting and began acting in Summer stock theater, singing in church choirs and started studying acting at HB Studio.

Career 
Soules moved to New York in the mid 60s after high school to pursue an acting career, and initially worked behind the scenes in theater in a variety of positions. Her big break came in 1968 when she landed her first Broadway role, the part of Jeanie in the original Broadway production of Hair.

She continued to appear in a number of theater productions including four years in the play The Magic Show, Hands on a Hard Body, Grey Gardens, and The Crucible.

Soules joined Orange Is the New Black during its second season in the recurring role of Frieda Berlin. Starting with the show's sixth season, Soules was promoted to a series regular.

Personal life 
Soules is openly lesbian.

Filmography

Film

Television

References

External links
 
 

1946 births
Living people
20th-century American actresses
21st-century American actresses
Actresses from New Jersey
American film actresses
American stage actresses
American television actresses
American voice actresses
People from West Milford, New Jersey
American lesbian actresses
LGBT people from New Jersey
21st-century LGBT people